North Carolina Highway 700 (NC 700) is a primary state highway in the U.S. state of North Carolina.  The highway runs east–west from Eden to U.S. Route 29 (US 29) in Pelham.

Route description
NC 700 is a rural two-lane highway, starting in Eden, where it starts along a concurrency with US 311 and NC 770. The western terminus is at an interchange where in addition to US 311 and NC 770 passing through, NC 14 and NC 87 pass north and south. The three roads run together for over  before NC 700 heads south along Fieldcrest Street.  It goes southeast out of the Eden city limits then northeast through a mix of forest and farmland. It ends at an interchange with US 29 (future Interstate 785) just outside of the community of Pelham. The Piedmont Triad Visitor Center is located on NC 700 just west of the interchange.

History
Established in 1934 as a new primary routing from northwest of Eden to Pelham.  In 1957, NC 700 was truncated to the new freeway alignment of US 29. In 2000, NC 700 was truncated at NC 14/NC 87/NC 770, when all state highways were removed from central Eden.

Junction list

References

External links

NCRoads.com: N.C. 700

700
Transportation in Rockingham County, North Carolina
Transportation in Caswell County, North Carolina